Anastasia Vdovenco (born 20 April 1994) is a former professional Moldovan tennis player.

In her career, Vdovenco won three singles and five doubles titles on the ITF Circuit. On 10 April 2017, she reached her best singles ranking of world No. 415.

Vdovenco made her debut for the Moldova Fed Cup team in May 2013 and accumulated a win–loss record of 4–8 in Fed Cup competition.

ITF Circuit finals

Singles: 8 (3 titles, 5 runner-ups)

Doubles: 9 (5 titles, 4 runner-ups)

National representation

Fed Cup
Vdovenco made her Fed Cup debut for Moldova in 2013, while the team was competing in the Europe/Africa Zone Group III, when she was 19 years and 18 days old.

Singles (2–7)

Doubles (2–1)

References

External links
 
 
 

1994 births
Living people
Sportspeople from Chișinău
Moldovan female tennis players